Breaking Open the Head: A Psychedelic Journey into the Heart of Contemporary Shamanism is a book written by author and journalist Daniel Pinchbeck, founding editor of the literary journal Open City.  Published in 2002, Breaking Open the Head covers, in Pinchbeck's words, the cultural history of psychedelic use, philosophical and critical perspectives on shamanism, and his personal transformation from a cynical New York litterateur to psychedelic acolyte.

Pinchbeck details his initiation with the Bwiti and their use of iboga. The account remains personal with Pinchbeck crediting the experience with an insight into his reliance on alcohol.

See also
Dimethyltryptamine
Ibogaine
Psilocybin

References

External links
Official site - complements book and offers public discussion forums.

2002 non-fiction books
Ayahuasca
Books about spirituality
Entheogens
Iboga
Psychedelic literature
Shamanism
Broadway Books books